St Albans Football Netball Club, nicknamed the Supersaints, is an Australian rules football and netball club based at St Albans Reserve, East Geelong, Victoria. The club teams currently compete in the Geelong Football League (GFL), the premier league in Geelong.

History
The club was formed in 1880, making it one of the oldest in the Geelong area. They defeated Drysdale to win a premiership in 1904.

After the World War II the club spent many years in the Woolworths Cup competition of the Geelong & District Football League. Promoted to Division one from 1973 they then joined the Geelong Football League when that league was founded in 1979 and won back to back flags in 1987 and 1988.

Premierships
 Geelong Football League (2):
 1987, 1988
 Geelong & District Football League (6):
 1949, 1954, 1964, 1968, 1971, 1972

Senior Ladder Positions Since 2009
Ladder positions since 2009:

 2009- 11th
 2010- 9th
 2011- 12th
 2012- 11th
 2013- 8th
 2014- 9th
 2015- 7th
 2016- 9th
 2017- 11th
 2018- 11th

Bibliography
 Cat Country: History of Football In The Geelong Region by John Stoward –

References

External links
 SportsTG website

Geelong Football League clubs
1897 establishments in Australia
Geelong & District Football League clubs
Sports clubs established in 1897
Australian rules football clubs established in 1897
Netball teams in Melbourne
Australian rules football clubs in Geelong